Sudhir Memorial Institute Tamluk  (SMI Tamluk) is an English Medium School in Tamluk, Purba Medinipur, West Bengal, India. It is a franchisee school under Sudhir Memorial Institute Group of Institutions (SMI) which has many other branches located in various parts of West Bengal and also working on expanding it's chain in the coming time. Sudhir Memorial Institute Tamluk (SMI Tamluk) is affiliated with CBSE. The school is accredited by the Central Board of Secondary Education (CBSE), currently the largest educational board in the country of India. It is recognized by the Department of Education, the government of NCTE Delhi and the Ministry of HRD, Government of India.

It is the only English-Medium Private School in Purba Medinipur that participates in Republic Day celebration held on 26 January at the Tamluk Stadium.

The school is a higher secondary school, from Toddlers to  class 12

History
The school was founded in 2012. Beginning in 2012, today Sudhir Memorial Institute (S.M.I) has become a premier English Medium School in Purba Medinipur. This Co-educational school is located amidst the nature and supported 300 students , 40 qualified , experienced and trained teachers as well as 15 non- teaching Staff with all modern amenities like Library , Laboratories , Playground , School Bus and premier coaching classes on WBJEE (MAIN and ADV), IIT, MEDICAL (NEET), PMT at easy affordable price . It has got the best teacher award in 2017 by UEM & IEM and again in 2018

S.M.I provides a platform for all students to grow morally, intellectually, physically and socially by forming the habits of basic virtues like honesty, hard work and dedication. Students are encouraged to share with experts, the experience of happening, discovering the truth, and disproving long-standing misconceptions of this ever-changing wondrous world.

This institution was founded society with a vision to impart education in a process where, apart from academic and non – academic activities, cultural and aesthetic values are also cultivated among the students. This procedure forms a complete “BharatiyaSiksha” which has always commanded the respect of the world.

This is the one and only organization where all the students and parents are treated with special care.

It has a special care unit for the special children with students counselling facility by Psychologists. It has smart classes for the development of slow learners.

Career Counselling , DMIT Test & Mid Brain Activation Also Done Here

Extra-curricular activities
 Music
 Dance
 Drawing
 SUPW
 Karate

References

Schools in Purba Medinipur district
Educational institutions established in 2012
2012 establishments in West Bengal